The Bryant Bulldogs football program represents Bryant University in college football. As of the upcoming 2022 season, the Bulldogs are football-only members of the Big South Conference and compete at the NCAA Division I Football Championship Subdivision (FCS) level. The team has played its home games at Bulldog Stadium in Smithfield, Rhode Island from 1999 to 2016, after which it was renamed Beirne Stadium.

History
Bryant University football was created in 1999 joining the Division II Northeast-10 Conference which they had been charter members of since the conference's inception.

Bryant has only had 4 coaches since its inception. The first Bulldog coach was Jim Miceli who coached the team from 1999 until 2003 followed by the second Bulldog coach Marty Fine, who coached the team from 2004- 2016. Before becoming the Bryant head coach, Fine was an assistant head coach at Iowa State University. In his third year as Bryant head coach, Fine led the Bulldogs to the playoffs. Fine resigned from his position on December 1, 2016. On January 3, 2017, Bryant University hired of James Perry as the 3rd head coach of the Bulldog football program. Perry left Bryant to join his alma-mater Brown University on December 3, 2018. On December 21, 2018 Bryant University President Ronald K. Machtley and Director of Athletics Bill Smith officially announced Chris Merritt as the fourth head coach of the Bryant football program.

Bryant made the playoffs in its 8th season as a team, hosting the first-round game against West Chester University. The crowd was the largest recorded in Bryant's short history with 5,434 fans in attendance. The game came down to the final drive with Bryant in possession, but came up short after an interception, sealing the game and the win for West Chester University.

With Bryant's success not only in football but in all sports, Bryant began its transition to Division I. Bryant considered three conferences; The Northeast Conference, The Patriot League and The Metro Atlantic Athletic Conference. With the move to Division I, Bryant would have the ability to offer scholarships to its football players for the first time in program history. After a long search, Bryant accepted an invite to the NEC and started competing in Division I in 2008–09. They became playoff-eligible and a full member of the NEC in 2012.

On March 29, 2022, Bryant announced it would leave the NEC to join the America East Conference, which does not sponsor football. On the same day, Bryant announced that its football team would join the Big South Conference, which had announced a month earlier that it would merge its football league with that of the Ohio Valley Conference after the 2022 season.

The beginning, the Miceli era
Bryant Bulldogs football started in the fall of 1999. They played their first season in front of great support. In their home opener against Assumption College the team packed the stands with 4,817 fans. From 1999–2002 the team operated at around .500, they showed signs of great play, but still showed that they were a young team. The team was showing improvement and the fans were enjoying it. Bulldog Stadium has been drawing fans since the beginning, on the other hand the team was not doing as well. In 2003 it was an all-time low and the end of the Miceli era. The team posted a 3–7 record, with two losing streaks of three. With the resignation of Coach Miceli after the 2003 season. Which led to the time of change at Bryant and in athletics it began with the addition of coach Marty Fine.

Marty Fine era

Marty Fine took over the football team in the 2004 season. 2004 was a major year for Bryant; it went from Bryant College to Bryant University; this change was the stepping-stone to all future university moves. One of those was athletics, and coach Fine was a piece to the puzzle. In his first season, he posted a .500 record, but everyone around the program saw the direction he was taking the team. Being an assistant head coach at Iowa State University, he brought the drive and expectations of a Division I program with him. During the next two seasons under Marty Fine the team posted 7–3 and 8–3 records (0–1 in playoffs).  He also brought the hype to the program that was needed.

Under Fine the team has brought in many Division I transfers the most notable is Lorenzo Perry, a transfer from UMass Amherst. Lorenzo Perry in just two years broke almost all the rushing records at the university. He was also a finalist in the Harlen Hill Award, the Heisman Trophy for Division II, while he did not win the trophy he did make the NCAA All-American Team. During his four-year tenure, he became the all-time leader in wins for Bryant football and has turned the program around and brought in great recruiting classes.

The biggest move in the Fine era was the move to Division I. Under coach fine they had three consecutive winning seasons before the move to Division I. The team also had its longest win streak at seven straight to start the season. All these accomplishments sent the team up perfectly for the transition. In 2008 the team began to give its first scholarships and began play in the top division of college athletics.

The James Perry era
On January 3, 2017 Bryant University President Ronald K. Machtley and Director of Athletics Bill Smith announced the hiring of James Perry as the next head coach of the Bulldog football program. An outstanding quarterback during his playing days, Perry has instilled an offensive mentality of "Fast and Physical" football to each of his coaching stops. He has led Princeton to Ivy League titles in 2013 and 2016, coaching three All-Ivy League quarterbacks over the past four seasons and guiding the Tigers into one of the program's most impressive offensive eras.

A 2000 graduate of Brown University, Perry is no stranger to the Ocean State, spending three years at his alma mater as an offensive assistant before joining the Princeton staff in 2010. He coached the quarterbacks and served as recruiting coordinator for the Bears, helping them win an Ivy League crown in 2008. Michael Dougherty thrived under Perry, graduating eighth all-time in league history with 487 career completions and 11th all-time with 5,763 career passing yards while also setting a still-standing Ivy League record for total offense in a game (538 yards in 2008).

As a quarterback at Brown, Perry led the Bears to the 1999 Ivy League Championship, finishing the season with 3,255 passing yards and 27 touchdowns. He was named a finalist for the Walter Payton Award and was the recipient of both the Bulger Lowe Award as the Outstanding Offensive Player of the Year in New England and the New England Football Writers Gold Helmet of the Year. He was a three-time First Team All-Ivy League pick and earned the 1999 Ivy League Player of the Year.

In addition to his numerous accolades, Perry set virtually every school and Ivy League passing record during his playing career. He graduated as the all-time leader in total offense in a career (9,236), passing yards in a career (9,294) and season (3,255), completions in a career (789) and season (309), and touchdown passes in a career (74) and game (6), still holding the Ivy League mark in the final three. Perry threw for over 400 yards in a game seven times in his career.

On December 3, 2018, it was announced that Perry had accepted the head coaching job at his alma mater Brown University. Perry served as the Bulldogs' head coach for the 2017 and 2018 seasons, posting back-to-back winning seasons and a 12-10 record overall.

The Chris Merritt era
On December 21, 2018 Bryant University President Ronald K. Machtley and Director of Athletics Bill Smith officially announced Chris Merritt as the fourth head coach of the Bryant football program. Merritt spent the past 18 years as the head coach at Christopher Columbus High School in Miami, Florida. He posted an overall record 172-45 (.792), leading the Explorers to two state finals appearances (2014, 2018), five Regional Championships, 14 District Championships and an 80-4 record in district competition in the largest high school classification in the state of Florida. In addition, Merritt's program has produced over 100 collegiate football players in 18 seasons at the helm of Christopher Columbus.

All-time records

Coaches

Series

Year by year performance

Playoff appearances

NCAA Division II playoffs
The Bulldogs made two appearances in the Division II playoffs, with a combined record of 0-2.

References

External links
 

 
American football teams established in 1999
1999 establishments in Rhode Island